Frank Eugene Wilson (December 22, 1857 – July 12, 1935) was a U.S. Representative from New York.

Biography 
Born in Roxbury, New York, Wilson attended the public schools and the Poughkeepsie Military Academy.
He was graduated from the Jefferson Medical College, Philadelphia, Pennsylvania, in 1882.
Practiced medicine in Pleasant Valley, New York, until April 1888. He moved to Brooklyn, New York, in 1888 and continued the practice of medicine.
Senior physician, a director, and member of the board of governors of the Bushwick Hospital and visiting physician to the Swedish Hospital, both of Brooklyn.

Tenure in Congress 
Wilson was elected as a Democrat to the Fifty-sixth, Fifty-seventh, and Fifty-eighth Congresses (March 4, 1899 – March 3, 1905). He was an unsuccessful candidate for reelection in 1904 to the Fifty-ninth Congress. He served as delegate to the Democratic National Convention in 1900.

Wilson was elected to the Sixty-second and Sixty-third Congresses (March 4, 1911 – March 3, 1915). He was not a candidate for renomination in 1914.

Later career and death 
He resumed the practice of medicine in Brooklyn, New York, until his death there July 12, 1935. His remains were cremated and the ashes deposited in Roxbury Cemetery, Roxbury, New York.

References 

1857 births
1935 deaths
Thomas Jefferson University alumni
Democratic Party members of the United States House of Representatives from New York (state)
People from Roxbury, New York